Lorea Ibarzabal (born 7 November 1994) is a Spanish middle-distance athlete. She has twice won the Spanish national title over 800m indoors.

Career
In February 2021 Ibarzabal won the gold medal in the 800 meters at the Spanish Championships held in Madrid, running a time of 2.05.81. In February 2023 she ran the second fastest time by a Spanish woman ever indoors over 800m when she ran 2:01.00 in Metz. That month she won the Spanish indoor 800m national title for a second time.

She competed in the 800 metres at the 2023 European Athletics Indoor Championships in Istanbul in February 2023. It was her first major competition representing Spain and she said they were emotional qualifying heats for her as she was competing on the birthday of her running partner Bea who had died four months previously. She reached the final,
qualifying directly with the third fastest time from the semi-finals. In the final she came two hundredths of a second away from bronze but ran a personal best time of 2:00.87 to finish fourth.

Personal life
Ibarzabal was born in Las Palmas, Gran Canaria but is now based in Madrid. Her father is from Zumarraga in the Gipuzkoa province of the Basque country. Her maternal grandfather is Spanish poet Manuel Padorno.

References

External links

1994 births
Living people
Spanish female middle-distance runners
Sportspeople from the Canary Islands
Spanish Athletics Championships winners
20th-century Spanish women
21st-century Spanish women